WFXW (channel 15) is a religious television station in Greenville, Mississippi, United States, owned and operated by Tri-State Christian Television (TCT). The station's transmitter is located northeast of Shaw, Mississippi.

From 1980 to 2016, the station broadcast as CBS affiliate WXVT.

History
Its first broadcast was on November 7, 1980, under the call sign WXVT. It had been a CBS affiliate for its entire existence. Before this, WJTV in Jackson had served as the default affiliate. The station was originally owned by Big River Broadcasting. Future sister station WABG-TV (channel 6, now a dual ABC/Fox affiliate) was actually the Delta's original CBS affiliate when it launched back in October 1959. However, a few months later, WJTV complained that WABG was encroaching on its service area. This is because WABG's signal reaches the far northern fringes of the Jackson market. Big River Broadcasting sold the station to Lamco Communications in 1984. Lamco then sold WXVT to a local ownership group in 1991. Saga Communications purchased WXVT in 1999.

On May 4, 2012, an application was filed with the Federal Communications Commission (FCC) to transfer ownership of WXVT from Saga Communications to H3 Communications. H3 Communications is owned by the adult children of Charles Harker, president of Commonwealth Broadcasting Group, which owns WABG and NBC affiliate WNBD-LD (channel 33). On January 28, 2013, the FCC granted the sale of WXVT, and it was completed two days later. Commonwealth then took over WXVT's operations, effectively bringing all of the Delta's Big Three network stations under the control of one company.

H3 Communications agreed to sell WXVT to Cala Broadcast Partners for $3.7 million on October 30, 2015; concurrently, Cala would purchase WABG-TV, WNBD-LD, and WFXW-LD from Commonwealth Broadcasting Group. Cala is jointly owned by Brian Brady (who owns several other television stations, mostly under the Northwest Broadcasting name) and Jason Wolff (who owns radio and television stations through Frontier Radio Management). On November 30, 2015, Cala assigned its right to purchase WXVT to John Wagner for $100,000. The sale was completed on August 1, 2016; on that date, the station went off the air, with Wagner stating in a filing with the FCC that it was looking for new programming.

The licenses were separated into two on June 26, 2017, with a low-powered CBS affiliate carrying WXVT's former intellectual unit, and a station on channel 15 that was still dark. The latter license changed its call letters to WFXW on July 25. On July 29, 2019, WFXW returned to the air and returned programming from Ion Television to the Greenville–Greenwood market for the first time since 2011 after former affiliate WHCQ-LD (channel 8) dropped the affiliation for MyNetworkTV.

In February 2019, Reuters reported that Apollo Global Management had agreed to acquire the entirety of Brian Brady's television portfolio, which it intends to merge with Cox Television (which Apollo is acquiring at the same time) and stations spun off from Nexstar Media Group's purchase of Tribune Broadcasting, once the purchases are approved by the FCC. In March 2019 filings with the FCC, Apollo confirmed that its newly-formed broadcasting group, Terrier Media, would acquire Northwest Broadcasting, with Brian Brady holding an unspecified minority interest in Terrier. In June 2019, it was announced that Terrier Media would instead operate as Cox Media Group, as Apollo had reached a deal to also acquire Cox's radio and advertising businesses. The transaction was completed on December 17.

Donation to Tri-State Christian Television
On March 9, 2020, it was announced that John Wagner would donate WFXW to Radiant Life Ministries, an affiliate company of Tri-State Christian Television. The transaction was completed on June 12, making WFXW an owned-and-operated station of the TCT network and the first full-power religious station in the Delta area. 

On June 26, 2020, WFXW began airing TCT programming on 15.1. As a result, the Ion affiliation was moved to a subchannel of WFXW on 15.2.

Programming
Syndicated programming on the then-WXVT included Wheel of Fortune, Jeopardy!, Divorce Court, and Judge Joe Brown.

Technical information

Subchannels
The station's digital signal is multiplexed:

Analog-to-digital conversion
WFXW (as WXVT) shut down its analog signal, over UHF channel 15, on February 17, 2009, the original target date in which full-power television stations were to transition from analog to digital television under federal mandate (which was later pushed back to June 12). The station's digital signal remained on its pre-transition UHF channel 15, using PSIP to display its virtual channel as 15 on digital television receivers.

References

External links

Tri-State Christian Television affiliates
Ion Television affiliates
Defy TV affiliates
TrueReal affiliates
Scripps News affiliates
Television channels and stations established in 1980
FXW
1980 establishments in Mississippi